They Flew Alone (released in the US as Wings and the Woman) is a 1942 British biopic about aviator Amy Johnson directed and produced by Herbert Wilcox and starring Anna Neagle, Robert Newton and Edward Chapman. It was distributed in the UK and the US by RKO Radio Pictures.

Plot
The film chronicles the life of Amy Johnson, the British pilot who had gained world attention in the 1930s for her exploits, among them two solo record flights from London to Cape Town in South Africa, and who had joined the Air Transport Auxiliary at the outbreak of the Second World War. It was intended to be both a film honouring Johnson, who had died in 1941 during a ferry flight of an Airspeed Oxford, and a propaganda call to arms at the height of the war years.

Cast

 Anna Neagle as Amy Johnson
 Robert Newton as Jim Mollison
 Edward Chapman as Mr. Johnson
 Nora Swinburne as ATA Commandant
 Joan Kemp-Welch as Mrs. Johnson
 Brefni O'Rorke as Mac
 Charles Carson as Lord Wakefield
 Martita Hunt as Miss Bland
 Anthony Shaw as Official
 Eliot Makeham as Mayor of Croydon
 David Horne as Solicitor
 Miles Malleson as Vacuum Salesman
 Aubrey Mallalieu as Bill, the Barber
 Charles Victor as Postmaster
 Hay Petrie as Old General
 John Slater as Officer on Interview Panel
 Percy Parsons as Man
 Cyril Smith as Radio Operator On Aquitania
 George Merritt as Reporter
 Muriel George as Kitty, the Housekeeper
 Ian Fleming as Secretary
 William Hartnell as Scotty (as Billy Hartnell)
 Arthur Hambling as Policeman
 Peter Gawthorne as RAF Officer
 Ronald Shiner as mechanic at Stag Lane

References

External links
 
 
 
 10K bullets: DVD review of They Flew Alone Retrieved 2013-01-06

1942 films
British aviation films
1940s war drama films
British black-and-white films
1940s English-language films
Films directed by Herbert Wilcox
British World War II propaganda films
British war drama films
British biographical drama films
Films scored by William Alwyn
RKO Pictures films
Cultural depictions of Amy Johnson
1940s biographical drama films
Films set in London
Films set in Australia
1942 drama films